The Equus Bass 770 (stylized EQUUS BASS 770) is a handcrafted American luxury muscle car manufactured by the company Equus Automotive. It is named after Equus Automotive's founder, Bassam Abdallah.

At its launch, six models were available: Accent, Accent Plus, Design, Design Plus, Edition and Collection.

Design 
The car's exterior design was inspired by many classic muscle cars of the 1970s, including the Chevrolet Camaro, Dodge Challenger,  Dodge Charger, Plymouth Barracuda, Pontiac GTO, Ford Mustang, and AMC Marlin.

The interior is made to sport a vintage look, with retro-spec gauges, switches and steering wheel, while maintaining a modern aspect, with many LED components used for the exterior, an infotainment system and a GPS navigation system along with parking sensors are utilized for the interior.

Vehicle data 
The car's chassis and body are made of aluminum, keeping its weight as low as possible, with additional carbon fiber inlets to enhance structural strength and stability. The entire vehicle is handcrafted.

The car uses a  LS9 supercharged 90.5-degree V8 engine derived from the Chevrolet Corvette ZR1. All the power is delivered to the rear wheels by a 6-speed rear-mounted dual-clutch transmission making the car a rear-wheel drive car.

The car uses tires of sizes 255/4OZR19 at the front and 285/40ZR19 at the rear. Brembo six-piston brake calipers at the front and four-piston calipers at the rear along with carbon ceramic matrix (CCM) ventilated and cross-drilled brake rotors are utilised for effective braking.

The Bass 770 uses many systems to keep maintain stability while being driven, including Magnetic Selective Ride control, Performance Traction Management, an Active Handling System with traction control system and variable-ratio power steering.

Other media
The car made an appearance in the mobile phone video game Asphalt Street Storm Racing as well as Asphalt 8: Airborne and a modified off-road version made its appearance in Asphalt Xtreme.

References

External links
 Official website

Coachbuilders of the United States
Cars of the United States
Cars introduced in 2013
Front mid-engine, rear-wheel-drive vehicles